Mahalakshmi Engineering College is an engineering college in Trichy, Tamil Nadu, India. The college is affiliated with Anna University, Chennai and has been approved by the All India Council for Technical Education.

It is situated 9 km from Srirangam Railway station.

History
Mahalakshmi Engineering College is a Group of Mahalakshmi Education Trust. The College Founded in 2011 by R.Ravi and M.Anantharaman.

Courses
B.E. Electronics and Communication Engineering
B.E. Electrical and Electronics Engineering
B.E. Computer Science and Engineering
B.E. Mechanical Engineering
B.E. Civil Engineering
B.E. Applied Science & Humanities

References

External links
 

Engineering colleges in Tamil Nadu
Colleges affiliated to Anna University
Universities and colleges in Tiruchirappalli
Educational institutions established in 2011
2011 establishments in Tamil Nadu